Poul Allin Erichsen (1910–1970) was a Danish clarinetist and composer.

See also
List of Danish composers

References

This article was initially translated from the Danish Wikipedia.

External links 
Finn Høffding Dialoger (Wolsing & Erichsen, 1950) (recording)

Male composers
Danish clarinetists
1910 births
1970 deaths
20th-century Danish composers
People from Aarhus
20th-century Danish male musicians